Dasypogoninae is a subfamily of robber flies in the family Asilidae. There are more than 60 genera and 520 described species in Dasypogoninae.

Genera
These 62 genera belong to the subfamily Dasypogoninae:

Aczelia Carrera, 1955
Allopogon Schiner, 1866
Alvarenga Carrera, 1960
Amorimius Papavero, 2009
Annamyia Pritchard, 1941
Aphamartania Schiner, 1866
Apolastauroides Artigas and Papavero, 1988
Apothechyla Hull, 1962
Araripogon Grimaldi, 1990
Araucopogon Artigas and Papavero, 1988
Archilaphria Enderlein, 1914
Archilestris Loew, 1874
Aspidopyga Carrera, 1949
Aterpogon Hardy, 1930
Austenmyia Carrera, 1955
Bamwardaria Hradsky, 1983
Blepharepium Rondani, 1848
Brevirostrum Londt, 1980
Caroncoma Londt, 1980
Chryseutria Hardy, 1928
Chylophaga Hull, 1962
Cleptomyia Carrera, 1949
Comantella Curran, 1923
Cyrtophrys Loew, 1851
Dakinomyia Hardy, 1934
Daptolestes Hull, 1962
Dasypogon Meigen, 1803
Deromyia Philippi, 1865
Diogmites Loew, 1866 (hanging-thieves)
Erythropogon White, 1914
Hodophylax James, 1933
Lastaurina Curran, 1935
Lastaurus Loew, 1851
Lestomyia Williston, 1884
Megapoda Macquart, 1834
Metalaphria Ricardo, 1912
Molobratia Hull, 1958
Neocyrtopogon Ricardo, 1912
Neoderomyia Artigas, 1971
Neodiogmites Carrera, 1949
Neosaropogon Ricardo, 1912
Omninablautus Pritchard, 1935
Opseostlengis White, 1914
Palaeomolobra Hull, 1962
Paraphamartania Engel, 1930
Parataracticus Cole, 1924
Paraterpogon Hull, 1962
Pegesimallus Loew, 1858
Phonicocleptes Lynch ArribÃ¡lzaga, 1881
Pronomopsis Hermann, 1912
Pseudorus Walker, 1851
Questopogon Dakin and Fordham, 1922
Rachiopogon Ricardo, 1912
Saropogon Loew, 1847
Senobasis Macquart, 1838
Stizochymus Hull, 1962
Taracticus Loew, 1872
Thereutria Loew, 1851
Theromyia Williston, 1891
Theurgus Richter, 1966
Tocantinia Carrera, 1955
 †Stenocinclis Scudder, 1878

References

Further reading

 
 
 
 

Asilidae
Articles containing video clips
Brachycera subfamilies